Allgood may refer to:

People with the surname
 Jill Allgood, British producer, author and film director
 Justin Allgood, American football player
 Mitchell Allgood, Australian rugby league player
 Sara Allgood, an Irish actress
 Thomas Allgood (senior), inventor of the Pontypool japan process

Places
 Allgood, Alabama

See also
 All Good Music Festival